The 2008 Primera División Apertura is the first football tournament of the Mexican Primera División 2008−09 season. The tournament began in August 2008 and was contested by the league's 18 teams.

Reigning champion Santos Laguna failed to advance to the final losing 2-1 on a two-leg aggregate (0-0 in the first leg) to eventual champions Toluca in the semifinals, and were unable to defend their title. The team of Toluca would beat Cruz Azul 7-6 in penalties after tying 2-2 on a two-leg aggregate (2-0 in the first leg). This was Toluca's 9th championship, placing them as the third most successful club behind América and Guadalajara.

Teams and Stadia

Managerial changes
This is a list of managerial changes made during the tournament.

Regular season

Standings

Group standings

Results

Playoffs

 If the two teams are tied after both legs, the higher seeded team advances.
 Both finalist qualify to the 2009–10 CONCACAF Champions League. The champion qualifies directly to the Group Stage, while the runner-up qualifies to the Preliminary Round.

Top goalscorers

Source: MedioTiempo

See also
List of Transfers of Torneo Clausura 2008 (Mexico)

References

External links 
Official Website

 

Aper
Mexico